"Leadbeater's" most commonly refers to Leadbeater's possum, but may refer to several eponymous species:

Leadbeater's possum, (Gymnobelideus leadbeateri). Named after John Leadbeater
Southern ground-hornbill, (Bucorvus leadbeateri). Named after Benjamin Leadbeater
Major Mitchell's cockatoo, or Leadbeater's cockatoo (Lophochroa leadbeateri). Named after Benjamin Leadbeater.
Violet-fronted brilliant (Heliodoxa leadbeateri). A hummingbird named after Benjamin Leadbeater.

See also 
Leadbeater, a surname
Leadbetter (disambiguation)
Ledbetter (disambiguation)